Parasyntormon is a genus of flies in the family Dolichopodidae. It is closely related to Syntormon, and was formerly considered a synonym of it.

Species

 Parasyntormon appendiculatus Harmston & Knowlton, 1943
 Parasyntormon asellus Wheeler, 1899
 Parasyntormon classicus Harmston & Knowlton, 1943
 Parasyntormon emarginatus Wheeler, 1899
 Parasyntormon emarginicornis Curran, 1923
 Parasyntormon flavicoxa Van Duzee, 1922
 Parasyntormon fraterculus Van Duzee, 1922
 Parasyntormon hendersoni Harmston & Knowlton, 1939
 Parasyntormon hinnulus Wheeler, 1899
 Parasyntormon inornatus Becker, 1919
 Parasyntormon lagotis Wheeler, 1899
 Parasyntormon lepus Van Duzee, 1918
 Parasyntormon longicornis Van Duzee, 1933
 Parasyntormon montivagus Wheeler, 1899
 Parasyntormon mulinus Van Duzee, 1922
 Parasyntormon nigripes Harmston & Knowlton, 1943
 Parasyntormon occidentalis (Aldrich, 1894)
 Parasyntormon petiolatus Van Duzee, 1933
 Parasyntormon rotundicornis Van Duzee, 1926
 Parasyntormon utahnus Van Duzee, 1933
 Parasyntormon virens Harmston & Knowlton, 1943
 Parasyntormon wheeleri Aldrich, 1901

References

 Nearctic

Dolichopodidae genera
Sympycninae
Diptera of North America
Diptera of South America
Taxa named by William Morton Wheeler